The Commercial Traffic Company, dba CT Logistics, is a global corporation that provides supply chain management solutions.

About CT Logistics 
CT Logistics was founded in 1923.  CT Logistics performs freight audit and freight payment services.

The Commercial Traffic Company, dba CT Logistics, was founded in 1923 by: H.R. Snyder (first president), W.A. Aichele, C.C. Kalbrunner, V.C. Borrows and H.W. Elsner.

CT Logistics processes Sarbanes-Oxley-compliant freight payments in all modes for carriers and clients of all industries. The company utilizes 7 to 10 years of online data storage. CT Logistics consults on all aspects of supply chains.

References

Supply chain management